Dicoma cana is a species of flowering plant in the family Asteraceae.
It is found only in Yemen.
Its natural habitats are subtropical or tropical dry shrubland and plantations .

References

cana
Endemic flora of Socotra
Least concern plants
Taxonomy articles created by Polbot